Roseland-State Ballroom was once a swing-era ballroom in Boston, MA. Jazz musicians including Duke Ellington, Count Basie, Jimmy Lunceford, Artie Shaw & Billie Holiday, Cab Calloway, and Charlie Barnet played in the 1930s and 1940s. Artie Shaw's band (including Billie Holiday) built their reputation playing Tuesdays and Saturday nights there in 1938.

History 
For some of the 1930s, the Roseland-State was two ballrooms—the State and the Roseland—but around 1937, Charlie and Cy (Simon) Shribman assumed control and removed the wall in between the two ballrooms. They owned and operated the ballroom during its heyday in the swing era.

Malcolm X worked at the Roseland-State Ballroom as a shoeshiner in his youth and described lindy hop being danced there:"Showtime!" people would start hollering about the last hour of dance. Then a couple of dozen really wild couples would stay on the floor, the girls changing to low white sneakers. The band now would really be blasting, and all the other dancers would form a clapping, shouting circle to watch that wild competition as it began, covering only a quarter or so of the ballroom floor. The band, the spectators and the dancers would be making the Roseland Ballroom feel like a big, rocking ship. The spotlight would be turning, pink, yellow, green, and blue, picking up the couples lindy-hopping as if they had gone mad. "Wail, man, wail!" people would be shouting at the band; and it would be wailing, until first one and then another couple just ran out of strength and stumbled off toward the crowd, exhausted and soaked with sweat.
During that era, the Roseland-State was also host to other types of popular dances & musics of the time, such as waltzes and polkas.

During Malcolm X's time working at the Roseland-State, it was a segregated venue, with some nights for black audiences and other nights for white audiences.

In 1958 , Charlie Shribman sold the ballroom, and it was renamed the New State Ballroom. After that, it become home to mostly Irish and old time music.

The building that once housed the Roseland-State ballroom and the State theatre was demolished in 1968.

References 

Ballrooms in the United States
Entertainment venues in Boston
1968 disestablishments in Massachusetts
Dance in Massachusetts
1930s establishments in Massachusetts